The 2022 Turkish Women's Basketball Cup was the 29th edition of Turkey's top-tier level professional women's domestic basketball cup competition. The tournament was held between 22 and 26 March 2022 at the Servet Tazegül Spor Salonu in Mersin.

Qualified teams 
The top eight placed teams after the first half of the 2021–22 Women's Basketball Super League qualified for the tournament. The four highest placed teams are going to play the lowest seeded teams in the quarter-finals. The competition was played under a single elimination format.

Bracket

Quarterfinals

Semifinals

Final

See also
 2021–22 Super League

References

External links
Official Site

2021–22 in Turkish basketball
Turkish Basketball Cup